Ralph Randolph Johnson (born July 4, 1951) is an American singer, songwriter, musician and producer. Johnson is a member and percussionist of the funk/soul/disco band Earth, Wind & Fire.

Early life
Johnson was born and raised in Los Angeles. His father was a lyricist and his mother was a vocalist, and they had music always playing in their home. At the age of eight years old Johnson received his first snare drum and drum lesson. Johnson developed a love of R&B music, listening mainly to Motown and Stax and Sly and the Family Stone. He played in elementary, junior high and high school bands. At age 13, he attended a James Brown concert, which was his first live concert and was amazed by the three drum sets on the stage. In 1965, Johnson's brother introduced him to the world of Jazz. He join local bands "The Teen Turbans" and "The Masters Children".

Earth, Wind and Fire

In 1971, musician Maurice White the founder and bandleader of Earth, Wind & Fire, dismantled his band after recording two albums for Warner Brothers Records, leaving just him and his brother, bassist Verdine White. In December 1971, after White saw Johnson playing at a club in Los Angeles, he called and asked Johnson to audition for a new line up of Earth, Wind & Fire. White added Johnson, vocalist Helena Davis, vocalist Phillip Bailey, flutist Ronnie Laws, keyboardist Larry Dunn, and rhythm guitarist Roland Bautista to his new line up. Vocalist Jessica Cleave a former member of Friends of Distinction soon replaced Davis. The new members along with the White brothers, became the new version of Earth, Wind & Fire. In 1972, they left Warner Brothers and recorded their album, "The Last Days and Times" for CBS/Columbia Records.

As an Earth, Wind & Fire percussionist, Johnson was inducted into the Rock & Roll Hall of Fame, received 6 Grammy wins and 2 honorary Grammys, received a Star on the Hollywood Walk of Fame, earned 50 platinum and gold RIAA awards, 4 American Music Awards, and have sold over 90 million in record sales making them one of the world's best-selling bands of all time.

Solo projects
In 2000, Johnson traveled to Copenhagen, Denmark with Morris Pleasure to start a new conceptual jazz project. The members of jazz ensemble known as, "Audio Caviar", were Johnson, Pleasure and Steen Kyed. The band release an album entitled, "Transoceanic", that featured guest artists including, Howard Hewett, Janet Jackson, Johnson's band-mate, Phillip Bailey, Jonathan Butler, George Duke and others.
 
In 2014, Johnson teamed up with singer and writer, Siedah Garrett and released a Christmas song entitled, "Have a Very Merry Christmas" written by Johnson, Garrett, Erik Nuri and Raymond Crossley. The song was featured in the 2019 film, "Holiday Rush" starring singer Darlene Love.

In 2019, Johnson released a solo project entitled, "Co-Swagit (Everything's Cool)".

In March 2020, Johnson and jazz pianist Gerald Clayton released a single entitled, "Smooth and You" written by Johnson, Raymond Crossley, Gerald Clayton, and D. Stone. The song was produced by Johnson and Crossley.

Johnson has worked with a wide range of artists in different capacities. As a percussionist on Blue Magic's 1978 album Message From The Magic and Stanley Turrentine's 1981 album Tender Togetherness. He worked as a producer on The Temptations 1984 album Truly For You and Howard Hewett's 2008 album Howard Hewett Christmas. Johnson also worked with Drake, Nathan East, and Meghan Trainor and others.

Personal
When Johnson is not on the road, he is an assistant karate instructor at his teacher, Mark Zacharatos', school. Johnson holds two Blackbelt Degrees. A 1st Degree Tang Soo Do and a 3rd Degree in Kung Fu Sansoo. He is a certified scuba diver with an advanced open water certification and a student pilot. Johnson is a tremendous lover of jazz and an art collector.

Discography

With Earth, Wind and Fire

Other projects
1978 – Blue Magic, "Message From The Magic" album (Drums)
1981 – Stanley Turrentine, "Tender Togetherness" (Percussion)
1984 – The Temptations, "Treat Her Like A Lady" single (Co-Producer)
2001 – Jay-Z sampled Johnson's song entitled, "Song Cry" which was on his first Blueprint CD.
2003 – Audio Caviar, (Album) "Transoceanic" (Performer, Percussion, Drums, co-arranger, Co-writer and Co-producer).
2008 – Howard Hewett, "Howard Hewett Christmas" (Audio Production, Drums, Main Personnel)
2014 – Johnson and Siedah Garette, "Have A Very Merry Christmas" (Co-writer and performer)
2016 – Nathan East, "Serpentine Fire" (Featured Artist, Vocals)
2017 – Nathan East, "Reverence" (Featured Artist, Percussion) 
2019 – Johnson, "Co-Swagit (Everything's Cool)" (Writer, Performer)
2020 – Meghan Trainor, "	"Holidays" off of her album, "A Very Trainor Christmas" (Composer, Percussion)
2020 – Drake, "When to Say When" (Composer) 
2020 – Ralph Johnson and Eric Clayton, "Smooth and You" (Co-writer and Co-producer)

Awards

RIAA Awards
Multi-platinum albums
1975 – That's The Way of the World 
1975 – Gratitude 
1976 – Spirit
Platinum albums
1973 – Head to the Sky 
1974 – Open Our Eyes 
1981 – Raise! 
Gold albums
1980 – Faces
1983 – Powerlight 
1987 – Touch The World 
1988 – The Best Of Earth, Wind & Fire Vol. II 
2003 – The Essential Earth, Wind & Fire 
Gold singles
1975 – Shining Star 
1975 – Singasong 
1976 – Getaway 
1978 – September 
1978 – Got To Get You into My Life 
1979 – Boogie Wonderland 
1979 – After The Love Has Gone 
1981 – Let's Groove

Inductions
1995 – Star on Hollywood's Walk Of Fame
2000 – Rock & Roll Hall Of Fame
2003 – Inducted into Hollywood's RockWalk 
2003 – Inducted into The Vocal Group Hall Of Fame
2012 – Beacon of Change award at the Beacon Awards Banquet
2019 – Kennedy Center Honors

Grammy Awards
2016 – Lifetime Achievement Award 
2008 – GRAMMY Hall Of Fame, "Shining Star"
2004 – NARAS Signature Governors Award
1982 – Best R&B Performance by a Duo Or Group With Vocals, "Wanna Be With You" 
1979 – Best R&B Vocal Performance by a Duo, Group Or Chorus, "After The Love Has Gone"
1979 – Best R&B Instrumental Performance, "Boogie Wonderland"
1978 – Best R&B Vocal Performance by a Duo, Group Or Chorus, "All 'n All"
1978 – Best R&B Instrumental Performance, "Runnin'"
1975 – Best R&B Vocal Performance by a Duo, Group Or Chorus, "Shining Star"

American Music Awards
1976 – Favorite Band, Duo Or Group – Soul/Rhythm & Blues
1977 – Favorite Band, Duo Or Group- Soul/Rhythm & Blues
1978 – Favorite Band, Duo Or Group- Soul/Rhythm & Blues
1980 – Favorite Band, Duo Or Group- Soul/Rhythm & Blues

Other awards
1994 – NAACP Hall Of Fame Image Award
2002 – BET Lifetime Achievement Award 
2002 – ASCAP Rhythm & Soul Heritage Award
2002 – TV Land's Entertainer Award 
2008 – Honorary Doctorates in the arts from Columbia College in Chicago

References

External links

Earth, Wind & Fire's official website

1951 births
Living people
20th-century American drummers
American funk drummers
American male drummers
American soul musicians
American tang soo do practitioners
Musicians from Los Angeles
Earth, Wind & Fire members
Soul drummers
Kennedy Center honorees